Kari Elisabeth Kaski  (born 12 July 1987) is a Norwegian politician. A member of the Socialist Left Party, she has been an MP for Oslo since 2017, and the second vice chair of the Standing Committee on Finance and Economic Affairs since 2021.

Personal life and education
Born in Kirkenes, Kaski studied at the BI Norwegian Business School, the University of Oslo, and the University of Burgundy.

She is the sister of Ragnhild Kaski, a former general secretary of the Workers' Youth League.

She is married to fellow party member Ola Wolff Elvevold, with whom she has one child. She was originally going to give birth to twins but one died before it was born.

Political career

Party politics 
Kaski is currently the party's spokesperson on finance.

She was the party's general secretary from 2015 to 2017. She then became a member of the party's Working Committee.

She and Torgeir Knag Fylkesnes were the two candidates for the Second Deputy leadership at the party's 2019 convention after Snorre Valen had announced that he would be stepping down. Fylkesnes won with 108 votes against Kaski's 100. After her loss, she criticised the leadership for not having a strong environmental profile.

After Audun Lysbakken announced that he would not be seeking re-election as leader, Kaski was floated as a possible contender to succeed him, alongside Kirsti Bergstø and Torgeir Knag Fylkesnes. She was endorsed by the party's county chapters in Viken, Vestfold and Telemark and Nordland. Aftenposten also reported that it was likely for the Socialist Youth to endorse her, as they had done so before. However, on 2 January 2023, Kaski announced that she wouldn't be seeking the leadership, siting family reasons.

Parliament 
Kaski was elected to the Storting in the 2017 election. She won re-election in 2021. In addition, she became the second deputy chair of the Standing Committee on Finance and Economic Affairs.

In her capacity as the party's spokesperson on finance, she helped to negotiate with the government parties, Labour and Centre Party, on the revised state budget for 2022.

References

1987 births
Living people
Socialist Left Party (Norway) politicians
Members of the Storting
Politicians from Oslo